Free Again is an album by saxophonist Gene Ammons recorded in 1972 and released on the Prestige label.

Reception
Allmusic awarded the album 3 stars.

Track listing 
 "Crazy Mary" - 4:50
 "Free Again"  (Armand Canfora, Joss Baselli, Robert Colby) - 6:20
 "Fru Fru" (Gene Ammons, Bobby Bryant) - 4:35
 "What Are You Doing the Rest of Your Life?" (Alan Bergman, Marilyn Bergman, Michel Legrand) - 4:37 
 "Jaggin'" (Bobby Bryant) - 5:05  
 "Jackson" (Gene Ammons, Bobby Bryant) - 5:25

Personnel 
Gene Ammons - tenor saxophone
Cat Anderson, Al Aarons, John Audino, Buddy Childers, Gene Coe, Reunald Jones - trumpet 
Jimmy Cleveland, Grover Mitchell, Benny Powell, Mike Wemberley, Britt Woodman - trombone
David Duke, Henry Sigismonti - French horn
Tommy Johnson - tuba
Pete Christlieb, Red Holloway - tenor saxophone
Jack Nimitz, Jerome Richardson, Herman Riley, Ernie Watts - reeds
Dwight Dickerson, Joe Sample - piano
Arthur Adams, Dennis Budimir - guitar
Bob Saravia - bass
Chuck Rainey - electric bass
Otis "Candy" Finch,  Paul Humphrey - drums
Bob Noris - congas
Bobby Bryant - arranger, conductor

References 

Gene Ammons albums
1972 albums
Prestige Records albums
Albums produced by Ozzie Cadena